Compass Coffee is an American coffee roaster based in Washington, D.C. It was founded in 2014 and operates in Washington, D.C. and Virginia. The company attracted attention in 2020 for eliminating the tipping of staff, which employees claimed resulted in a loss of income for them. , the company has 14 stores.

History 

The company was founded by Michael Haft and Harrison Suarez in 2014. Following the Shaw neighborhood store, a second store was opened in the same neighborhood in September 2015. Over the next few years, other stores were opened in Washington DC and Arlington, Virginia.

Compass was served in the White House during the Veterans Day Commemoration Speech in 2015.

On October 20, 2017, Compass Coffee founders Haft and Suarez received the District of Columbia Chamber of Commerce's Community Impact Award at the 2017 Chamber's Choice Gala.

Elimination of Tipping 
Towards the beginning of 2020, Compass Coffee eliminated the option for patrons to tip workers, but offered a base pay increase to offset "lost wages." Workers at the company's different locations compiled their hourly wages in a shared spreadsheet to determine whether the pay change coupled with the elimination of tips actually constituted a pay raise. They found that, in nearly every case, loss of tips was greater than the hourly pay increase. This led to the creation of the Compass Coffee Union, which despite strong efforts to fight for better treatment of employees and higher wages, was stamped out by the March 2020 layoffs.

Impact of COVID-19 
Due to the impact of COVID-19, Compass laid off 150 of its 189 employees in March 2020. The remaining staff had their pay cut to $15 per hour, and about 20 of the staff assisted in the construction of a new roasting facility.

References 

Coffee brands
Coffee companies of the United States